The 1985 Ugandan Super League was the 18th season of the official Ugandan football championship, the top-level football league of Uganda.

Overview
The 1985 Uganda Super League was contested by 14 teams and was won by Kampala City Council FC, while Simba FC and Mbale Heroes were relegated.

League standings

Leading goalscorer
The top goalscorer in the 1985 season was Frank Kyazze of Kampala City Council FC with 28 goals.

References

External links
Uganda - List of Champions - RSSSF (Hans Schöggl)
Ugandan Football League Tables - League321.com

Ugandan Super League seasons
Uganda
Uganda
1